The University of South Alabama (USA) is a public research university in Mobile, Alabama. It was created by the Alabama Legislature in May, 1963, and replaced existing extension programs operated in Mobile by the University of Alabama. The first classes were held in June 1964, with an enrollment of 276 students; the first commencement was held in June 1967, with 88 bachelor's degrees awarded.

USA is divided into ten colleges and schools that include one of Alabama's two state-supported medical schools. In the fall semester of 2018, South Alabama had an enrollment of 15,093 students. By the spring of 2019, the university had awarded over 90,000 degrees. It is classified among "R2: Doctoral Universities – High research activity".

USA has an annual payroll of more than $400 million (US), with over 6,000 employees, and is the second-largest employer in Mobile. The university claims to have an annual economic impact of US$3 billion.

Academics

The university offers a range of undergraduate and graduate degrees in ten colleges and schools. Several programs offer masters level degrees in addition to undergraduate degrees. Doctoral level degrees are offered in several areas, including a Doctor of Pharmacy degree offered in collaboration with Auburn University.

USA also offers classes in nearby Baldwin County at its Fairhope campus, and in 2015 opened its new Gulf Coast Campus in Gulf Shores. In all, undergraduate students at South Alabama can choose from more than 50 bachelor's degree and certificate programs while there are more than 40 master's degree programs. As of 2011, USA ranks as the 22nd best public university in the southern United States, and 52nd overall (in the South). It has an acceptance rate of 86.5%.

The student-faculty ratio at USA is 18:1, and the school has 44.1 percent of its classes with fewer than 20 students. USA students are 57% female and 43% male. As of 2018, the university had a 44% six-year graduation rate and a 22% four-year graduation rate for bachelor's degree programs.

Colleges

The University of South Alabama has ten colleges and schools:
 Pat Capps Covey College of Allied Health Professions
 College of Arts and Sciences
 Mitchell College of Business
 College of Education and Professional Studies
 College of Engineering
 College of Medicine
 College of Nursing
 School of Computing
 Honors College
 Graduate School

Administration
The university is governed by a board of trustees appointed by and including the governor of Alabama. The board appoints a president of the university. Since the founding of the university, there have been four presidents. Frederick Palmer Whiddon served from 1963 until 1998 and was succeeded by V. Gordon Moulton who served until 2013. John W. Smith, the current executive vice president, served as an interim president until the arrival of Tony G. Waldrop in 2014 and after his retirement in 2021. Jo Bonner was appointed as university president on November 10, 2021.

Athletics

The Jaguars participate in 17 NCAA sanctioned sports (8 men's and 9 women's), and are founding members of the Sun Belt Conference. Men's sports include football, basketball, baseball, tennis, cross country, golf, indoor track and field, and outdoor track and field. Women's sports include basketball, softball, soccer, tennis, cross country, volleyball, indoor track and field, outdoor track and field, and golf. All sports participate in the Sun Belt Conference, a Division I/FBS conference. The school is often referred to as simply "South", "USA", or the "Jags", but the more formal South Alabama is often used as well.

Football
The university announced the creation of an NCAA sanctioned football team on December 6, 2007, with the goal of fast tracking the program to full FBS status by the 2013 season.  The school's first ever game was played on September 5, 2009, in front of 26,000+ fans at Ladd-Peebles Stadium in Mobile.  Since starting the football program from scratch, South Alabama has built a state of the art football facility and has several practice fields featuring both natural and artificial turf.  The Jaguar Training Center, the largest practice facility in Alabama at 96,000 square feet, was constructed prior to the 2018 football season.  South Alabama then added Hancock Whitney Stadium, which is an on-campus football stadium that opened in September, 2020.  Since construction, the stadium and practice facility have been used for other events, such as Senior Bowl and LendingTree Bowl.

Basketball
The basketball program has reached the NCAA tournament eight times.  The most notable performance was the win against the University of Alabama in 1989.  The Jaguars have been beaten by the eventual national champion 3 of those 8 times: Michigan in 1989, Arizona in 1997, & Florida in 2006 with the Michigan loss occurring in the second round.  South Alabama men's and women's basketball play in the 10,000+ seat Mitchell Center.

Baseball
South Alabama has a strong history in baseball, having reached NCAA Tournament post-season play 28 times and seeing 34 players reach All-American status, 168 players sign professional contracts, and 27 players reach MLB.  South Alabama's home park is Eddie Stanky Field, which is a 4,500-seat stadium featuring a natural grass playing surface.  The Jon Lieber Clubhouse was originally constructed in 2005, but was torn down following the 2019 season to build a new Jon Lieber Clubhouse that was completed prior to the 2020 baseball season.  South Alabama Baseball also has the Luis Gonzalez Indoor Hitting Facility, featuring three hitting stations, two pitching mounds, and a locker room for umpires.  The facility is also big enough to conduct infield practice. Notable baseball players include Luis Gonzalez, David Freese, Juan Pierre, and Marlon Anderson.

Legal and other matters

Police shooting
On October 12, 2012, 18-year-old freshman Gil Collar was shot by a campus police officer, after appearing naked outside the police station. The university released a statement saying a campus police officer "was confronted by a muscular, nude man who was acting erratically." (Collar was 5 foot 7, and weighed 135 pounds.) Authorities state that Collar appeared to be on drugs when the incident occurred. The student's family filed suit against the university, the officer involved, and the police chief, Herbert Earl "Zeke" Aull. In February 2013, a Mobile County judge ruled that the university was not liable for the student's death. in 2014 the case moved to federal court. In 2015, the officer was cleared in a civil suit. In 2016, the family requested that the Alabama Supreme Court rehear their appeal of the lower court verdict that cleared the officer. The shooting inspired Brian Burghart, then editor of the News & Review in Reno, to found Fatal Encounters, a database that tracks killings by law enforcement officers.

2014 federal discrimination lawsuit
On April 4, 2014, a group of students belonging to Students for Life USA, a pro-life student organization, filed a complaint about alleged discrimination in federal court against University of South Alabama officials. The university later settled the lawsuit, paying the students an undisclosed amount of money. According to a copy of the settlement document provided by the Alliance Defending Freedom, the university "denied all material allegations and Plaintiff's claims of constitutional infirmities". USA agreed to change a portion of its policy on use of its space and facilities, and to pay an unspecified sum settling "all of plaintiff's remaining claims, including liability, damages, and attorney's fees".

Abuse lawsuits
In September 2021, a lawsuit was filed against a former University of South Alabama volleyball coach due to alleged sexual and mental abuse in 2019 and 2020. The lawsuit initially included two former players but was amended in December 2021 to include six additional former players as plaintiffs. The amendment also alleged that university administrators had knowledge of the abuse and added the university's athletic directors and coaches as defendants. A second lawsuit was filed in 2022 by a former player uninvolved in the first lawsuit. WKRG-TV reported that the claims of abuse made by the second lawsuit was similar to the first and that both allegations included inappropriate touching and overtraining. The volleyball coach was hired by the University of South Alabama in December 2018 and resigned in February 2021.

Student life

Housing
 Beta/Gamma Community consists of fifteen small buildings containing one-person, two-person, and four-person apartments.
 Epsilon Community contains both traditional and non-traditional residence halls. Epsilon 1 and Epsilon 2 are traditional halls housing first-time freshmen Learning Communities (LCs). The non-traditional residence hall of Delta 6 has a kitchenette in every room for freshmen and upperclassmen. A total of 471 residents live in this community with 156 in Delta 6 and the remaining 315 residents in Epsilon 1 & 2.
 Delta Community is made up of four non-traditional residence halls that house 535 residents: Delta 3–5. Both freshmen and upperclassmen live in this community. Laundry rooms are located at one end of Delta 3, Delta 4, and inside the Delta Commons.
 Stokes Hall Community opened Fall of 2011 and features 330 suite-style rooms. Stokes Hall also has one classroom, eight study lounges, two multipurpose rooms, interior hallways, and a large laundry room.
 Azalea Hall Community (previously New Hall Community) opened fall 2013. This four-story traditional residence hall is home to 350 first-time freshmen, with two students per room. The new building includes one classroom that seats 25, two large study lounges, two community lounges, a large laundry room, two Community Director offices, and one faculty member office.
 Camellia Hall Community is a four-story traditional residence that houses 370 first-time freshmen, with two students per room.
 Fraternity & Sorority Housing Community consists of five sororities and four fraternities for a total of nine Greek chapter houses on-campus.  The nine Greek organizations with houses are Kappa Alpha, Sigma Chi, Pi Kappa Alpha, Pi Kappa Phi,  Alpha Gamma Delta, Alpha Omicron Pi, Chi Omega, Kappa Delta, and Phi Mu.

Greek life

Organizations

The following are Greek organizations that existed at the University of South Alabama that are no longer active sorted by the date they received their national charter
 Delta Lambda Phi, (Beta Beta Chapter) founded in 2000 until 2005 was the first Gay, Bisexual, and progressive male fraternity at the University of South Alabama that did not discriminate on the basis of sexual orientation.
 Kappa Sigma (IFC Fraternity), Kappa Nu chapter founded in 1969 (inactive since 2022)
 Sigma Nu, (IFC Fraternity), Theta Mu chapter founded in 1970.
 Lambda Chi Alpha, (IFC Fraternity), Phi Gamma chapter founded in 1972.
 Theta Xi, (IFC Fraternity), Gamma Gamma chapter founded February 16, 1974
 Sigma Phi Epsilon, (IFC Fraternity), Alabama Eta Chapter founded 1987
 Zeta Tau Alpha, (Panhellenic Sorority), Zeta Phi chapter, founded in 1969 (inactive since 1994)
 Chi Sigma Omega, a fraternity that existed in 1975 for veterans. This was not a national fraternity.

Notable alumni 

Notable alumni of the University of South Alabama include:
 Tina Allen (1949-2008), sculptor
 Marlon Anderson (second baseman), former Major League Baseball infielder
 Kawaan Baker, American football player
 Jake Bentley, American football player
 Rosalynn Bliss, first woman to be elected Mayor of Grand Rapids, Michigan 
 Glenn Borgmann, former Major League Baseball catcher
 Braedon Bowman, American football player
 Herbert L. "Sonny" Callahan, former United States Congressman (attended but did not graduate)
 Terry Catledge, former NBA Player
 Grant Enfinger, professional race car driver; currently competes in the ARCA Racing Series presented by Menards and the NASCAR Camping World Truck Series
 Steve Falteisek, former Major League Baseball pitcher
 David Freese, Major League Baseball infielder; currently with the Los Angeles Dodgers; 2011 World Series MVP Award and 2011 NLCS MVP Award winner.
 Luis Gonzalez, former Major League Baseball outfielder; 5-time All-Star.
 Carolyn Haines, American romance and mystery author
 Lance Johnson, former Major League Baseball outfielder
 Michael Kearney, world's youngest college graduate
 Jon Lieber, former Major League Baseball pitcher
 Dan Povenmire, American animator, co-creator of the Disney Channel series, Phineas and Ferb
 John Prine, former Basketball Student Manager
 Adam Lind, Major League Baseball first baseman; currently an unsigned free agent
 Rodger McFarlane (1955-2009), gay rights activist and first executive director of Gay Men's Health Crisis.
 Mark Mostert, Professor of Special Education at Regent University author and lecturer on Eugenics and Facilitated Communication.
 Mike Mordecai, former Major League Baseball infielder
 Juan Pierre, former Major League Baseball outfielder; known for stealing 614 bases and ranking 18th all-time on the stolen bases leaders list.
 Heath Slocum, professional golfer; currently plays on the PGA Tour
 Courtney Smith, American football player
 Eddie Stanky, Major League Baseball player and manager; former head coach of USA Baseball Program
 Larry Stutts, Alabama state senator
 Jessie Tompkins, former Nationally ranking hurdler in Track and Field and civil-rights activist
 P.J. Walters, former Major League Baseball pitcher; last played with Lancaster Barnstormers (Independent League baseball) in 2015.
 Turner Ward, former Major League Baseball outfielder; currently a hitting coach for the Cincinnati Reds.
 Harold G. White, Mechanical Engineer, Aerospace Engineer, and applied Physicist known for promoting advanced propulsion concepts and is the Advanced Propulsion Team Lead for the NASA Engineering Directorate

Publications 
 USA Vanguard
 The Lowdown
 The Oracle
 Due South
 College Student Journal (founded 1966).

Notes

References

External links

 
 South Alabama Athletics website

 
University of South
Universities and colleges in Mobile, Alabama
Educational institutions established in 1964
Universities and colleges accredited by the Southern Association of Colleges and Schools
Medical schools in Alabama
1964 establishments in Alabama
BSL3 laboratories in the United States